In mathematics, an autonomous system is a dynamic equation on a smooth manifold. For instance, this is the case of non-autonomous mechanics.

 

For instance, this is the case of  Hamiltonian non-autonomous mechanics.

A second-order dynamic equation

  

connection  on a jet bundle . This
equation also is represented by a connection on an affine jet bundle . Due to the canonical
embedding , it is equivalent to a geodesic equation
A free motion equation in non-autonomous mechanics exemplifies a second-order non-autonomous dynamic equation.

See also
 Autonomous system (mathematics)
 Non-autonomous mechanics
 Free motion equation
 Relativistic system (mathematics)

References 
  De Leon, M., Rodrigues, P., Methods of Differential Geometry in Analytical Mechanics (North Holland, 1989).
 Giachetta, G., Mangiarotti, L., Sardanashvily, G., Geometric Formulation of Classical and Quantum Mechanics (World Scientific, 2010)    .

Differential equations
Classical mechanics
Dynamical systems